Ribeirão may refer to:

Places
Brazil
Ribeirão, Pernambuco, municipality in the state of Pernambuco
Ribeirão Arrudas, stream in the state of Minas Gerais
Ribeirão Auila, river in the state of Mato Grosso
Ribeirão Barra Mansa, river in the state of São Paulo
Ribeirão Bonito, municipality in the state of São Paulo
Ribeirão Branco, municipality in the state of São Paulo
Ribeirão Cascalheira, municipality in the state of Mato Grosso
Ribeirão Claro, municipality in the state of Paraná
Ribeirão Corrente, municipality in the state of São Paulo
Ribeirão Crisóstomo, river in the state of Mato Grosso
Ribeirão da Paz, river in the state of Pará
Ribeirão das Lajes, river in the state of Rio de Janeiro
Ribeirão das Neves, municipality located in the state of Minas Gerais
Ribeirão do Largo, municipality in the state of Bahia 
Ribeirão do Pinhal, municipality in the state of Paraná
Ribeirão do Sul, municipality in the state of São Paulo
Ribeirão dos Índios, municipality in the state of São Paulo
Ribeirão Grande, municipality in the state of São Paulo
Ribeirão Lontra, river in the state of Mato Grosso do Sul
Ribeirão Pindaíba, river in the state of Mato Grosso
Ribeirão Pires, municipality in the state of São Paulo
Ribeirão Preto, municipality in the state of São Paulo
Ribeirão River, river in the state of Espírito Santo 
Ribeirão Santa Maria, river in the state of Pará
Ribeirão Santana, river in the state of Pará 
Ribeirão Vermelho, municipality in the state of Minas Gerais

Portugal
Ribeirão, a parish in Vila Nova de Famalicão
G.D. Ribeirão, Portuguese football club

See also
Ribeirão do Tempo, Brazilian telenovela